Carl Steadman is co-founder of Suck.com, creator of several pieces of early web-savvy literature and former operator of Plastic.com.

He was also production director for HotWired, and appeared in the 1999 documentary Home Page.

Works
 Suck Contributor: Carl Steadman
 Placing - "Placing doesn't depict the future so much as portray the present"
 Rats To Cats!
 "Two Solitudes", a 1995 e-mail story
 Carl's original homepage
 Carl's "tilde site" at Freedonia
 Steadman wrote an untitled essay about leaving Suck.com, published on the Rox website in July 1996.

References

External links
 
 Carl's self-written bio (to about age 26)

American Internet celebrities
Living people
1970 births